Toshiba AC100 (or Dynabook AZ in Japan, code named Paz00 by Compal) is a smartbook device from Toshiba that was announced in June 2010.

Technical details

Hardware 
The mainboard is derived from the Nvidia Tegra Harmony reference board.

The main CPU is a Tegra 250 SoC which consists of:

 dualcore 1 GHz Cortex-A9 processor, 1 MB L2 cache
 ULP GeForce GPU
 DDR2 controller, 512 MB RAM (256+256 MB chips)
 dual display controller (lvds+hdmi)
 jpeg encoder/decoder
 video encode/decoder
 sound chip
It is able to remain in stand-by mode for up to 7 days.

Supplemental chips are (among others)

 embedded flash (type depends on the model, e.g. Toshiba THGBM2G7D4FBAI9)
 embedded controller (ENE KB926QF-D3?)
 power management unit TPS658622A
 Wifi (Ralink/MSI rt3070sta)
 Bluetooth chip (optional)
 3G modem (optional, Ericsson Business Mobile Networks BV F3307 Mobile Broadband Module)

Software 
It is supported in the Linux kernel through a device tree file.

The AC100 is the reference device for the Ubuntu ARM port.

OS is Android v2.1 (upgradable to v2.2 since 2011 ).

Availability 
The device was officially available at the Toshiba United Kingdom site.

The AC100 was discontinued in 2011 and is no longer being manufactured.

Reception 
TechRepublic listed the AC100 as one of the 25 "unique and bizarre breakthroughs" in laptop innovation, because it was one of the first laptops that ran Android.

References

External links 
 Toshiba AC100 wiki
 Toshiba AC100 Russian wiki
elinux.org Toshiba AC100

Linux-based devices
Smartbooks
Toshiba